The Twins, also officially known as Ma Kong Shan, are a pair of mountains in southern Hong Kong. They are a popular destination for hikers and fitness enthusiasts as part of the rigorous Violet Hill-The Twins Hike on Hong Kong Island. Hiking up The Twins involves walking up a long steep set of stairs featuring more than 1000 steps straight up.

Geography 

The Twins are two peaks of similar height lined up from north to south. To the north of the Twins lies another prominent hill called Violet Hill.

Access 

Section 1 of the Wilson Trail runs through the top ridges of The Twins. It is possible to go to the Twins from either Stanley, Tai Tam Reservoirs, or Repulse Bay

See also 
 List of mountains, peaks and hills in Hong Kong
 Tai Tam Reservoirs
 Stanley, Hong Kong

References

External links 

Wilson Trail No. 1

Southern District, Hong Kong